FK BSK Batajnica is a football club based in Batajnica, Belgrade, Serbia. They compete in the Belgrade Zone League, the fourth tier of the national league system.

History
The club achieved its biggest success by reaching the quarter-finals of the 1996–97 FR Yugoslavia Cup. They initially defeated Partizan 2–1 in the opening round, pulling off one of the biggest upsets in the history of Yugoslav and Serbian football. They subsequently eliminated Budućnost Podgorica, before eventually losing to Jedinstvo Paraćin.

In the COVID-19-suspended 2019–20 season, the club placed first in the Belgrade Zone League and gained promotion to the Serbian League Belgrade, returning to the third tier after 17 years.

Honours
Belgrade Zone League (Tier 4)
 2019–20
Belgrade First League (Tier 5)
 2014–15 (Group A)

Notable players
This is a list of players who have played at full international level.
  Radovan Radaković
For a list of all FK BSK Batajnica players with a Wikipedia article, see :Category:FK BSK Batajnica players.

References

External links
 
 Club page at Srbijasport

1925 establishments in Serbia
Association football clubs established in 1925
Football clubs in Belgrade
Sport in Zemun